John Christian Wedge (born March 20, 1957) is an American filmmaker, voice actor and cartoonist. He is known for directing the films Ice Age (2002), Robots (2005), Epic (2013), and Monster Trucks (2016). He is a co-founder of the now-defunct animation studio Blue Sky Studios and voices the character Scrat in the Ice Age franchise since 2002.

Early life
Wedge was born in Binghamton, New York. During his teenage years, Wedge lived in Watertown, New York which was rumored to be the inspiration for the town where his film Robots takes place, however he later dismissed this in an interview. He became interested in animation when he was 12 years old: "Back then, there was a TV special about kids making cut-out animation in a workshop—as I recall it was Yellow Ball Workshop—it was a clear technique to follow and I followed it. That fascinated me and it got me started. It was so simple, effective and magical in outcome and I stuck with creating things throughout my childhood, teenage years and then college."

He attended Fayetteville-Manlius High School, graduating in 1975. He received his BFA in Film from State University of New York at Purchase in Purchase, New York in 1981, and subsequently earned his MA in computer graphics and art education at the Ohio State University. He has taught animation at the School of Visual Arts in New York City where he met his future film directing partner, Carlos Saldanha.

Career
In 1982, Wedge worked for MAGi/SynthaVision, where he was a principal animator on the Disney film Tron, credited as a scene programmer. Some of his other works include The Brave Little Toaster.

Wedge is the co-founder of the now defunct Blue Sky Studios, once one of the premier computer animation studios, and was its Vice President of Creative Development until the studio was closed by The Walt Disney Company in 2021. He is the owner of WedgeWorks, a film production company founded by Wedge.

In the 1990s, he and his studio worked on CGI effects for the movies Alien Resurrection and Titan A.E.

In 1998, he won an Academy Award for the short animated film Bunny. Wedge later directed Blue Sky Studios' first computer-animated film, 2002's Ice Age, and served as a producer for its sequels. He also voices Scrat in the film series, performing the character's "squeaks and squeals." In 2005, Wedge directed Robots, based on a story he created with William Joyce. In 2013 followed Epic, loosely based on Joyce's book, The Leaf Men and the Brave Good Bugs.

In 2007, it was announced that Wedge would direct Hugo, though he was subsequently replaced by Martin Scorsese. In 2009, it was reported that Wedge would direct an animated feature film adaptation of Will Wright's Spore, but since then there has been no further news about the film.

Wedge directed the science fiction/action film Monster Trucks (2016). Jonathan Aibel and Glenn Berger wrote the script for the film, produced by Mary Parent.

Wedge reprised the role of Scrat in a series of shorts for Disney+ titled Ice Age: Scrat Tales, in addition to serving as an executive producer. The shorts premiered on the streaming platform on April 13, 2022.

Personal life
Wedge lives in Katonah, New York with his wife Jeanne Markel. They have a daughter and a son, Sarah and Jack.

Filmography

Feature films

Short films

Television Episodes and Specials

Video Games

Special Thanks

Critical reception

Awards and nominations

References

External links

IGN interview
BBC interview

1957 births
Living people
Animators from New York (state)
American animated film directors
American animated film producers
Animal impersonators
Animation screenwriters
Ohio State University alumni
Artists from Binghamton, New York
State University of New York at Purchase alumni
Fayetteville-Manlius High School alumni
People from Manlius, New York
Directors of Best Animated Short Academy Award winners
Blue Sky Studios people
People from Katonah, New York
Film directors from New York (state)